The 1981–82 Michigan State Spartans men's basketball team represented Michigan State University in the 1981–82 NCAA Division I men's basketball season. The team played their home games at Jenison Field House in East Lansing, Michigan and were members of the Big Ten Conference. They were coached by Jud Heathcote in his sixth year at Michigan State. The Spartans finished with a record of 11–17, 6–12 to finish in a tie for seventh place in Big Ten play.

Due to NCAA sanctions against Wisconsin for providing improper benefits for players, MSU's official record for the year is 12–16, 7–11.

Previous season
The Spartans finished the 1980–81 season 13–14, 7–11 in Big Ten play to finish in eighth place in conference.

Roster and statistics 

Source

Schedule and results

|-
!colspan=9 style=| Non-conference regular season

|-
!colspan=9 style=|Big Ten regular season

Awards and honors
 Kevin Smith – All-Big Ten First Team
Source

References

Michigan State Spartans men's basketball seasons
Michigan State
Michigan State Spartans men's b
Michigan